Arctomercaticeras is an extinct genus of cephalopod belonging to the Ammonite subclass and the family Hildoceratidae that lived during the Early Jurassic (Toarcian stage) in the Arctic zone of Russia.

References

Jurassic ammonites
Fossils of Russia
Toarcian life